Stathi Katsidis (19 February 1979 – 19 October 2010) was an Australian jockey.

Death 

Katsidis was found dead at his Brisbane home a fortnight before he was due to ride in the Melbourne Cup. A coroner's report showed that the Champion jockey had a cocktail of drugs and alcohol in his system when he was found dead.

References

1979 births
2010 deaths
Australian jockeys
Australian people of Greek descent
20th-century Australian people